Futbol Club L'Escala is a Spanish football club based in L'Escala in the comarca of the Alt Empordà in Catalonia, Spain. Its team plays in the Primera Catalana. The team sells many of its players and therefore can be seen as a feeder club. Recently it sold many players to Atromitos.

External links 
Official blog
fcf.cat profile

Association football clubs established in 1912
Football clubs in Catalonia
Divisiones Regionales de Fútbol clubs
1912 establishments in Spain